Diana Renee Bracalente (born July 29, 1963 in Quakertown, Pennsylvania) is a former field hockey player from the United States, who finished in eighth position with Team USA in the 1988 Summer Olympics in Seoul.

References

External links
 

1963 births
Living people
People from Quakertown, Pennsylvania
American female field hockey players
Olympic field hockey players of the United States
Field hockey players at the 1988 Summer Olympics
Old Dominion University alumni
La Salle University alumni
21st-century American women